Kristofer Hivju (born 7 December 1978) is a Norwegian actor. He is best known for playing the roles of Tormund Giantsbane in the HBO fantasy series Game of Thrones and Connor Rhodes in The Fate of the Furious.

Early life 
Hivju was born in Oslo, Norway.

In 2004, he graduated from the Danish (Aarhus) subdivision of the Russian Academy of Theatre Arts (GITIS).

Career 
He began of his career and starred in the television series, such as Fox Grønland and Seks som oss, in the 2008 film Manhunt, and plays at the Grusomhetens Teater and Trøndelag Teater, as well as written scripts for the short films Closework from 2005 and Flax from 2008.

In the several times, he portrays Viking King Olav II in Norwegian-produced documentary film Olav, and also appeared in From Hate to Hope.

In 2013–2019, Hivju had the role of Tormund Giantsbane in American fantasy series Game of Thrones by HBO. His first appearance was in the first episode of the third season, "Valar Dohaeris". In 2013, he also appeared in M. Night Shyamalan's science fiction film After Earth from the same year.

Personal life 
Hivju is the son of Norwegian actors Erik Hivju and Lieselotte Holmene and is the cousin of French actress Isabelle Nanty. He is married to Gry Molvær Hivju. Together they have two daughters, Noor (born in 2007) and Sylja (born in 2008).

Hivju also has great interest in disc golf, being an active player and community enforcer. In 2022, Innova Champion Discs released Hivju's own signature roc, a mid-range disc golf disc.

Health 
On 16 March 2020, Hivju announced on Twitter and Instagram that he tested positive for COVID-19 amidst the COVID-19 pandemic in Norway. On 15 April, Hivju said he had made a full recovery.

Filmography

Film

Television

Shorts and documentaries

References

External links

 
 Kristofer Hivju at Filmweb.no 

1978 births
Living people
Norwegian male film actors
21st-century Norwegian male actors
Male actors from Oslo
Norwegian male television actors
Best Supporting Actor Guldbagge Award winners